is a former Japanese football player and manager. She played for Japan national team.

Club career
Mikami was born in Ichihara on January 8, 1981. In 1996, she joined Nikko Securities Dream Ladies. The club also won L.League championship for 3 years in a row (1996-1998). However, the club was disbanded in 1998 due to financial strain. She moved to Tasaki Perule FC. In 2001 season, she was selected Best Eleven. In 2002, she moved to her local club JEF United Ichihara (later JEF United Chiba). In 2003, she went to United States and played university team. In 2007, she returned to JEF United Chiba. In 2009, she retired.

National team career
In November 1999, Mikami was selected Japan national team for 1999 AFC Championship. At this competition, on November 12, she debuted and scored 2 goals against Nepal. She played 3 games and scored 2 goals for Japan in 1999.

Coaching career
After retirement, Mikami became coach for youth team at JEF United Chiba. In 2014, she became manager for top team. She managed the team until 2017 season.

National team statistics

References

1981 births
Living people
People from Ichihara, Chiba
Association football people from Chiba Prefecture
Japanese women's footballers
Japan women's international footballers
Nadeshiko League players
Nikko Securities Dream Ladies players
Tasaki Perule FC players
JEF United Chiba Ladies players
Japanese women's football managers
Women's association footballers not categorized by position